Pedro Marcelo Arce Meaurio (born 9 August 1991) is a Paraguayan footballer who plays as a midfielder for Atlante FC.

References

External links
 
 
 
 

1991 births
Living people
Paraguayan footballers
Paraguayan expatriate footballers
Paraguay international footballers
Paraguayan Primera División players
Club Sol de América footballers
Atlante F.C. footballers
Ascenso MX players
Expatriate footballers in Mexico
Association football midfielders
Paraguayan expatriate sportspeople in Mexico